Guthred Hardacnutsson (Old Norse: Guðrøðr; ; born c.844 – died 24 August 895 AD) was the Christian king of Viking Northumbria from circa 883 until his death.

Life

Kings of Northumbria in the Norse era

The first known king of Viking York, Halfdan, was expelled in 877. In c. 883, Symeon of Durham's History of the Kings simply states, "Guthred, from a slave, was made king", but his History of the Church of Durham gives a longer account. Here he writes that after Halfdan was driven out:During this time the [Viking] army, and such of the inhabitants as survived, being without a king, were insecure; whereupon the blessed Cuthbert himself appeared in a vision to abbot Eadred [of the monastery at Carlisle]...[and] addressed him in the following words:—"Go to the army of the Danes," he said, "and announce to them that you are come as my messenger; and ask where you can find a lad named Guthred, the son of Hardacnut, whom they sold to a widow. Having found him, and paid the widow the price of his liberty, let him be brought forward before the whole aforesaid army; and my will and pleasure is, that he be elected and appointed king at Oswiesdune, (that is, Oswin's hill), and let the bracelet be placed upon his right arm.

It is not clear whether Guthfrith was a Christian, but his relations with the community of Saint Cuthbert, which was a major force in the former Bernicia, and which had lain outside the influence of Halfdan, whose authority was limited to the former Deira—approximately Yorkshire—were good. He granted much land between the River Tyne and the River Wear to the community. This had once belonged to the Wearmouth-Jarrow monastery, and formed the core lands of the church of Durham. Other lands, at the mouth of the River Tees, Guthred allowed Eadred to purchase for the church.

Symeon recounts that Guthred faced a large invasion by the Scots, which was defeated with the aid of Saint Cuthbert.

Death

Guthred died on 24 August 895 (or perhaps 894) and was buried at York Minster.

Æthelweard the 10th century historian, wrote in his  Chronicon for 895:

Cultural depictions

Literature
Guthred appears as a character in Bernard Cornwell's The Saxon Stories series, figuring particularly in The Lords of the North (2006).

Television
He is portrayed by Thure Lindhardt in the TV adaptation, The Last Kingdom.

Video games 
In Total War Saga: Thrones of Britannia, Guthred (spelled Guthfrid in the game) leads the playable faction of Northymbre.

Notes

References

External links 
 

895 deaths
Monarchs of Jorvik
9th-century English monarchs
Viking rulers
Year of birth unknown
9th-century Vikings